Jean Joseph Marie Léonce Laugier was Governor General for Inde française in the Second French Colonial Empire under Third Republic.

Biography 
Laugier was born on March 26, 1829, in Draguignan, France, to Joseph Honoré Isidore Laugier, a lawyer, and Marguerite Françoise Gattier. In 1868, he became Secretary General of the Interior in Cochinchina. During his time in Cochinchina, he received the Royal Order of Cambodia. On March 9, 1871, he was appointed Director of Interior Services in Réunion. He then received the Legion of Honour on August 7, 1877. He became Governor of French India in February 1879, a post he held until April of 1881. After retiring, Laugier died on June 22, 1900, in his hometown of Draguignan.

Titles held

References 

Year of death missing
Year of birth missing
French colonial governors and administrators
Governors of French India
People of the French Third Republic